Salahesh Fulbari (Nepali: सलहेश फुलवारी), also known as Fulbari Mela, is a garden of historical and cultural significance to the south of East West Highway in Lahan Municipality, Siraha District, Province No. 2, Nepal.  It is famous for an orchid that is believed to bloom only on the eve and first day of year, Baishakh, the first month of the Bikram Sambat calendar. This funfair is held at 4 km West from the city of Lahan at the area of 14 Acres.  

Named after local demigod Salahesh, the garden receives thousands of pilgrims from different parts of Nepal and India each year on the first day of Baishakh. The orchid grown at the tree is taken as a token of love between Salahesh, who is often taken as a folk hero in the Mithila region, and his beloved Malini. A temple has made with the statues of them at the side of the tree. The garden only opens on the New Year’s Eve. It is said that all the other days except than New Year day, the garden is filled with wild animals magically. Hence, no one is allowed to get into the premises on other days. According to priest, unlike other flowers, the leaves of this flower never fall on the ground, adding to the flower’s intrigue.

Mythology 
The funfair is organized on the myth of remembering King Salhesh's bravery, power, bravery, courage and love, a Hindu god, during 1325 BS. Legendary hero salahesh always use to visit with his beloved love "Jeeban Bhagat" Princess of Morang and daughter of King Maheswar Bhandari. It is said that Dauna/Deena could not get the love of Salahesh throughout her life so once a year she comes as beautiful flower in this garden to meet Salhesh.

References

Gardens in Nepal
1880s establishments in Nepal
Buildings and structures in Siraha District